The Directorate-General for Justice and Home Affairs (DG JAI) is a directorate-general of the General Secretariat of the Council of the European Union that prepares the work and tasks of the Justice and Home Affairs Council.

Structure
The DG JHA encompasses 2 Directorates, both headquartered in Brussels, Belgium:
 A: Home affairs
 B: Justice

See also
 European Commission
 Directorate-General for Justice and Consumers
 Directorate-General for Migration and Home Affairs

External links 
 European Commission: Directorate-General - official homepage
 European Commission - official homepage(all official languages)

Reference List 

Council of the European Union